Soyo I Thermal Power Station is a  natural gas-fired thermal power plant under construction in the town of Soyo in the Zaire Province of Angola.

Location

Overview
The power station is owned and operated by Luxerviza, a subsidiary company of the Sonangol Group, that manages natural gas plants. The power station supplies electricity to the city of Soyo and neighboring communities. The surplus power is integrated into the Angolan national electricity grid, to supply other communities, including Luanda. The plant uses natural gas, sourced from the Soyo LNG Plant and various national oil blocks.

Operation
The construction of this power station started in 2015. In 2017 the plant started producing electricity, beginning with 22 megawatts supplied to the city of Soyo. By April 2018, generation capacity had expanded to 388 megawatts. The original construction was performed by China National Machinery Industry Corporation (Sinomach), using electromechanical equipment supplied by Sepco, another  Chinese company. The initial construction cost was reported to be US$900 million.

Expansion
In November 2018, the government of Angola contracted an American consortium comprising Aenergy and General Electric, to upgrade the power station and increase its generation capacity to 750 megawatts. The contract price is US$220 million. The power station's new output is sufficient to supply over 3 million Angolan households. The upgrade and expansion are expected to conclude in 2022.

See also

List of power stations in Angola

References

External links
 Power Generation in Angola As of 3 January 2020.
 Angola – Energy: Angola Country Commercial Guide As at 22 August 2019.
 Angola converts diesel-fired thermal power plants to natural gas As of 3 June 2019.

Natural gas-fired power stations in Angola
Energy infrastructure in Angola
Soyo